Svenskådalen Nature Reserve is a nature reserve in Jämtland County in Sweden.

Svenskådalen Nature Reserve comprises an area of forested mountains and two valleys rich in wetlands. One of these also contains areas of old-growth forest. The area as a whole is characterised by untouched wilderness. To the west, the nature reserve touches on the border of Skäckerfjällen Nature Reserve. The nature reserve is part of the EU-wide Natura 2000-wide network.

References

Nature reserves in Sweden
Natura 2000 in Sweden
Geography of Jämtland County
Tourist attractions in Jämtland County
Protected areas established in 1990
1990 establishments in Sweden